Lawka Tharahpu Pagoda is a Buddhist pagoda in Dawei, Myanmar. The temple is notable for a  sculpture of a reclining Buddha located on the pagoda's grounds. The pagoda is a popular tourist destination.

References 

Buddhist temples in Myanmar